The Priory School in Kingston, Jamaica teaches kindergarten,  primary and secondary students, the latter under the name Priory High.

History
It was founded in 1944 as "The Priory House" by Henry Fowler, a Jamaican Rhodes scholar, political activist and patron of the arts and educational causes. Fowler was Priory's headmaster from its founding until his retirement in 1973.

Campus
Priory originally consisted of just one building, a former private residence "The Priory".  This had been built in 1907 by the Governor of Jamaica Hugh Clarence Bourne to replace the previous building destroyed in the 1907 Kingston earthquake. This previous building had been in use as a rectory and it was in allusion to this that the name "Priory" was chosen for the new building.

See also
 Education in Jamaica
 List of Schools in Jamaica

References

External links
 Aerial view
 www.prioryjamaica.com  - Website for former students and members of staff maintained by Priory 'Old Boy', Stephen Smith
 www.prioryyearbooks.com  - An addendum to prioryjamaica.com

Educational institutions established in 1944
Schools in Jamaica
Schools in Kingston, Jamaica
1944 establishments in Jamaica